The Union of Arab Football Associations (UAFA;) is the governing body of football in the Arab League. Established in 1974, UAFA has 22 member associations.

The UAFA is an association not recognised by FIFA.

History 
The Union of Arab Football Associations (UAFA) was established in 1974 in Tripoli, Libya. In 1976, a general assembly was held in Damascus, Syria, and the football association headquarters were transferred to their present seat in Riyadh, Saudi Arabia.

Presidents 
Mohamed Raouraoua is announced a new president of UAFA.

Member associations 
All UAFA members from the Asian Football Confederation and the Confederation of African Football are also members of the West Asian Football Federation (WAFF) and Union of North African Football Federations (UNAF). All WAFF and UNAF members are UAFA members.

Competitions 

Men's senior
Arab Cup
Pan Arab Games Football Tournament
Arab Futsal Cup
Arab Beach Soccer Championship

Men's youth
Arab Cup U-20
Arab Cup U-17
Arab Cup U-15

Women's senior and youth
Arab Women's Cup
Arab U-17 Women's Cup

Clubs
Arab Club Champions Cup
Arab Cup Winners' Cup (defunct)
Arab Super Cup (defunct)

Related competition 
Palestine Cup of Nations (defunct)

Current title holders

FIFA World Rankings

Men's national teams 
Rankings are calculated by FIFA.

Last updated 22 December 2022

Women's national teams 
Rankings are calculated by FIFA.

Last updated December 9, 2022

International competitions participation 
Legend

 — CAF teams
 — AFC teams

 — Champions
 — Runners-up
 — Third place
 — Fourth place
 – Semi-final (no third place match)
QF — Quarterfinals (1934–1938, 1954–1970, and 1986–present: knockout round of 8)
R2 — Round 2 (1974–1978, second group stage, top 8; 1982: second group stage, top 12; 1986–2022: knockout round of 16)
R1 — Round 1 (1930, 1950–1970 and 1986-present: group stage; 1934–1938: knockout round of 16; 1974–1982: first group stage)

Q — Qualified for upcoming tournament
 — Qualified but withdrew
 — Did not qualify
 — Did not enter / Withdrew / Banned / Entry not accepted by FIFA
 — Hosts
 — Not affiliated to FIFA

FIFA World Cup

Olympic Games

FIFA Arab Cup

Pan Arab Games

Defunct competitions

FIFA Confederations Cup

See also 
FIFA
Asian Football Confederation (AFC)
Confederation of African Football (CAF)

References

External links 
uafaac.com UAFA official website

Sports organizations established in 1974
 
Arab organizations
Association football governing bodies in Africa
Association football governing bodies in Asia
Association football governing bodies in the Arab world
Football in the Arab world